is a Japanese former breaststroke swimmer. She competed in two events at the 1976 Summer Olympics.

References

External links
 

1959 births
Living people
Japanese female breaststroke swimmers
Olympic swimmers of Japan
Swimmers at the 1976 Summer Olympics
Place of birth missing (living people)